The 2002–03 Segunda División B season of began in August 2002 and ended in May 2003.

Summary before the 2002–03 season 
Playoffs de Ascenso:

 Barakaldo 
 Cultural Leonesa
 Compostela (P) 
 Pontevedra
 Barcelona B 
 Espanyol B 
 L'Hospitalet
 Terrassa (P) 
 Real Madrid B
 Valencia B 
 Hércules 
 Getafe (P) 
 Motril 
 Ceuta 
 Almería (P)  
 Mérida

Relegated from Segunda División:

 Burgos
 Gimnàstic de Tarragona
 Extremadura
 Jaén

Promoted from Tercera División:

 Langreo (from Group 2)
 Real Avilés (from Group 2)
 Ribadesella (from Group 2)
 Noja (from Group 3)
 Racing de Santander B (from Group 3)
 Palamós (from Group 5)
 Gavà (from Group 5)
 Reus (from Group 5)
 Real Ávila (from Group 8)
 Linares (from Group 9)
 Torredonjimeno (from Group 9)
 Corralejo (from Group 12)
 Orihuela (from Group 13)
 Cacereño (from Group 14)
 Moralo (from Group 14)
 Peralta (from Group 15)
 Peña Sport (from Group 15)

Relegated:

 Sporting de Gijón B
 Oviedo B
 Caudal
 Universidad de Oviedo
 Real Sociedad B
 Eibar B
 Huesca
 Alfaro
 Benidorm
 Vecindario
 Onda
 Mensajero
 Linense
 Dos Hermanas
 San Fernando
 Coria
 Beasain

Administrative relegation:
 Granada (financial trouble)

Occupied the vacant spots by administrative relegations:
 Málaga B (occupied the vacant spot of Granada)

Group I
Teams from Asturias, Canary Islands, Castile and León, Community of Madrid and Galicia.

Teams

League table

Results

Top goalscorers

Group II
Teams from Aragon, Basque Country, Cantabria, Castilla–La Mancha, La Rioja and Navarre

Teams

League Table

Results

Top goalscorers

Group III
Teams from Balearic Islands, Castile and León, Catalonia and Valencian Community

Teams

League Table

Results

Top goalscorers

Group IV
Teams from Andalusia, Ceuta, Extremadura, Melilla and Region of Murcia

Teams

League Table

Results

Top goalscorers

Play-out

Semifinal

Final

External links
Futbolme.com

 
Segunda División B seasons

3
Spain